Protophormia is a genus of flies belonging to the family Calliphoridae.

The species of this genus are found in Eurasia and Northern America.

Species:
 Protophormia atriceps (Zetterstedt, 1845) 
 Protophormia terraenovae (Robineau-Desvoidy, 1830)

References

Calliphoridae
Muscomorpha genera